Rick Pearson may refer to:

 Rick Pearson (golfer) (born 1958), American golfer
 Richard Pearson (film editor) (born 1961), American film editor